Platinovec is a settlement in the hills east of Grobelno in the Municipality of Šmarje pri Jelšah in eastern Slovenia. The area is part of the traditional region of Styria. The municipality is now included in the Savinja Statistical Region.

References

External links
Platinovec at Geopedia

Populated places in the Municipality of Šmarje pri Jelšah